The 1961 Canada Cup took place June 1–4 at Dorado Beach in Dorado, Puerto Rico. It was the ninth Canada Cup event, which became the World Cup in 1967. The tournament was a 72-hole stroke play team event with 33 teams. These were the same teams that had competed in 1960 but without Central Africa and with the addition of Paraguay, Puerto Rico, Uruguay and Venezuela. Each team consisted of two players from a country. The combined score of each team determined the team results. The American team of Jimmy Demaret and Sam Snead won by 12 strokes over the Australian team of Kel Nagle and Peter Thomson. The individual competition was won by Sam Snead, with a tournament record score of 272, finishing eight shots ahead of Peter Thomson.

Teams

(a) - denotes amateur

Source

The Canadian Stan Leonard, American Arnold Palmer and South African Gary Player withdrew from the event. The Canada Cup was played at the same time as the Memphis Open, an official event on the 1961 PGA Tour. Under a PGA Tour rule, the three, as winners of official PGA Tour events in the previous 12 months, were unable to play in non-tour events where they clashed with official events. The sponsors of the Memphis Open refused to allow the three to play in the Canada Cup with the result that the players withdrew from both events. They were replaced by Al Johnston, Jimmy Demaret and Harold Henning.

Scores
Team

Source

International Trophy

Source

References

World Cup (men's golf)
Golf tournaments in Puerto Rico
Canada Cup
Canada Cup
Canada Cup